Theodore Jonathan Hart (May 7, 1816 - May 28, 1887) was a Canadian businessman from Montreal, Lower Canada. He was the son of Benjamin Hart and grandson of Aaron Hart. Hart was involved in various business interests in Montreal and trade to Britain.

Hart became a Unitarian after his second marriage. Retired due to health concerns, Hart died in France.

References

 

1816 births
1887 deaths
Theodore Hart
Businesspeople from Montreal
Canadian Jews
Canadian Unitarians
Canadian people of English-Jewish descent
Canadian people of German-Jewish descent
Deaths from stomach cancer
Deaths from cancer in France
19th-century Canadian Jews